The Hutiao River Viaduct is a prestressed concrete box girder bridge on the border of Pan County and Pu'an County in Guizhou, China.

See also
List of highest bridges in the world

External links

 Hutiao River Viaduct on HighestBridges.com

Bridges in Guizhou
Box girder bridges in China
Bridges completed in 2007